

Tiri may refer to:

Places
Tiri, Azerbaijan
Tiri, Central African Republic
Tiri, Estonia
Tiri, Lebanon

People
Max Tiri, Papua New Guinean rugby league player
Tiri Toa, Cook Islander professional rugby league player
Tiri (footballer) (born 1991), Spanish footballer

Other
Tîrî language, an Oceanic language spoken in New Caledonia
Tiri Monastery, in Georgia/South Ossetia

See also
m.v. Tiri, a radio ship once used by offshore broadcaster Radio Hauraki off New Zealand